Roy Ian Kitchener (born 1962) is a United States Navy vice admiral who currently serves as the Commander of the Naval Surface Forces and Naval Surface Force, U.S. Pacific Fleet. He previously served as the Commander of the Naval Surface Forces Atlantic. Kitchener earned a B.A. degree in political science from Unity College in 1984 and later received an M.A. degree in national security affairs from the Naval Postgraduate School specializing in Western Hemisphere studies.

References

External links

1962 births
Living people
Place of birth missing (living people)
Unity College (Maine) alumni
Naval Postgraduate School alumni
United States Navy admirals